Chandra Waskito Kusumawardana (born 19 August 1994) is an Indonesian professional footballer who plays as a forward for Liga 2 club Sulut United.

Club career

Persita Tangerang 
In 2018, Chandra Waskito signed a year contract with Persita Tangerang from Persis Solo.

RANS Cilegon
He was signed for RANS Cilegon to play in the second round of Liga 2 in the 2021 season. Chandra made his debut on 19 December 2021 in a match against Persiba Balikpapan at the Pakansari Stadium, Cibinong.

Honours

Club
Persita Tangerang;
 Liga 2 runner-up: 2019
RANS Cilegon
 Liga 2 runner-up: 2021

References

External links
 Chandra Waskito at Liga Indonesia

1994 births
Living people
Indonesian footballers
Liga 2 (Indonesia) players
Liga 1 (Indonesia) players
Persis Solo players
PSS Sleman players
Persita Tangerang players
RANS Nusantara F.C. players
Association football forwards
People from Surakarta
Sportspeople from Central Java